Inheritor or Inheritors may refer to:

Film and stage
 Inheritors (play), by Susan Glaspell
 The Inheritors (1970 film) (original title ), a 1970 Argentine film
 The Inheritors (1982 film) (de) (original title ), an Austrian film directed by Walter Bannert
 The Inheritors (1998 film) (original title ), an Austrian-German film directed by Stefan Ruzowitzky

Music

 The Inheritors (album), by James Holden

Television
 "The Inheritors" (The Outer Limits)
 "The Inheritors" (The Outer Limits 1995)
 The Inheritors (TV series) or The Heirs, a 2013 South Korean television series
 The Inheritors (1974 TV series), a 1974 British TV series

Novels and comics
 The Inheritor (novel), a 1930 novel by E.F. Benson 
 Inheritor (novel), a 1996 novel set in C. J. Cherryh's Foreigner universe
 Inheritors, by Brian Penton
 The Inheritors (Conrad and Ford novel), by Joseph Conrad and Ford Madox Ford
 The Inheritors (Robbins novel), by Harold Robbins
 The Inheritors (Golding novel), by William Golding
 Inheritors, a fictional group featured in the "Spider-Verse" storyline

See also
Inheritance (disambiguation)
 Heiress (disambiguation)
 Heir (disambiguation)